Wubu County is located in the southeastern corner of Yulin City, in the north of Shaanxi Province, China, and on the western bank of the Yellow River. It is opposite to Shanxi's Liulin County and also borders Jia County and Suide County. The typical landscape within the county is loess plateau and drought usually hovers in the area  creating serious soil erosion.

Overview
Location: 176 kilometers from Yulin, 260 kilometers from Yan'an, and 628 kilometers from Xi'an, the capital of the province.
Area: 418.5 square kilometers, the smallest county in northern Shaanxi.
Population: 80,000 (2002)
Code: 610829
Postal code: 718200
Government location: Songjiachuan Town
Administrative divisions: four towns and four townships
 Towns: Songjiachuan, Koujiayuan, Guojiagou, Xinjiagou
 Township: Xuexiacun, Chakou, Gongjiawan, Zhangjiashan

History
The area was used by Helian Bobo to detain the captives of Liu Yu of Song Dynasty of Southern Dynasty. So its former name was Wu'erbu
In Northern Han Dynasty, a stone city was built in Wubu. At present, some buildings from Ming and Qing Dynasties are still preserved. Due to the difficulty of water intake on the hill, most residents have moved to the new town at hill foot.
Wubu was a part of Shaan-Gan-Ning Border Area during Sino-Japanese War and Chinese Civil War

Administrative divisions
As 2019, Wubu County or Wubao County is divided to 1 subdistricts and 5 towns.
Subdistricts
 Songjiachuan Subdistrict

Towns

Climate

Economy
Wubu is an impoverished county. A large-scale high-quality coal mine was discovered in 2005, and remains to be exploited. Other natural resources include coal-derived gas, fluorite, and phosphates. China National Highway 307 and the Tai-Zhong railway pass through the territory. Special local products are red dates and silkworm.

Notable people
Liu Qing, writer
Zhang Weiying, economist

References

External links
Official website of Wubu County
Wubu Stone City (Chinese)

County-level divisions of Shaanxi